BH Macro is a large British investment company dedicated to the global fixed income and foreign exchange markets. Established in 2007, the company is a "feeder" fund into a fund managed by hedge fund Brevan Howard. The chairman is Richard Horlick. It is listed on the London Stock Exchange and is a constituent of the FTSE 250 Index.

References

Hedge fund firms in the United Kingdom
2008 establishments in the United Kingdom
Financial services companies established in 2008